The Williams-Wootton House, also known as the Dr. Williams Mansion, is a historic house at 420 Quapaw Avenue in Hot Springs, Arkansas.  It is a -story masonry structure, built out of brick, with asymmetrical massing and a variety of projecting gables, sections, and porches typical of the late Victorian Queen Anne period.  It has a rounded corner porch, supported by paired Tuscan columns in the Colonial Revival style.  The house was built in 1891 for Dr. Arthur Upton Williams, and was originally more strongly Queen Anne, particularly in its porch styling, which was altered in the early 20th century.

The house was listed on the National Register of Historic Places in 1978.

See also
National Register of Historic Places listings in Garland County, Arkansas

References

Houses on the National Register of Historic Places in Arkansas
Gothic Revival architecture in Arkansas
Colonial Revival architecture in Arkansas
Houses completed in 1891
Houses in Hot Springs, Arkansas
National Register of Historic Places in Hot Springs, Arkansas
Historic district contributing properties in Arkansas